Saaremaa is an island in the Baltic Sea belonging to Estonia.
Saaremaa may also refer to:
Saare County ( / Saaremaa), one of the 15 counties of Estonia, consisting of Saaremaa island and neighbouring islands
Saaremaa Parish, one of the 3 municipalities of Saare County, covering the whole Saaremaa island and some smaller neighbouring islets
Saaremaa, Võru County, village in Võru Parish, Võru County, Estonia
4163 Saaremaa, main-belt asteroid
Saaremaa virus, type of Hantavirus